Assumption Township is one of seventeen townships in Christian County, Illinois, USA.  As of the 2020 census, its population was 1,345 and it contained 656 housing units.

Geography

Cities, towns, villages
 Assumption

Unincorporated towns
 Dunkel at

Cemeteries
The township contains Saint Marys Cemetery, Greenwood Cemetery and Pleasant View Cemetery, all located in the City of Assumption

Major highways
  U.S. Route 51

Demographics
As of the 2020 census there were 1,345 people, 707 households, and 302 families residing in the township. The racial makeup of the township was 93.09% White, 0.89% African American, 0.00% Native American, 0.30% Asian, 0.00% Pacific Islander, 0.22% from other races, and 5.50% from two or more races. Hispanic or Latino of any race were 2.16% of the population.

There were 707 households, out of which 23.60% had children under the age of 18 living with them, 30.83% were married couples living together, 9.05% had a female householder with no spouse present, and 57.28% were non-families. 42.00% of all households were made up of individuals, and 26.00% had someone living alone who was 65 years of age or older. The average household size was 2.01 and the average family size was 2.88.

The township's age distribution consisted of 19.7% under the age of 18, 15.8% from 18 to 24, 16.9% from 25 to 44, 24.6% from 45 to 64, and 23.0% who were 65 years of age or older. The median age was 41.2 years. For every 100 females, there were 122.4 males. For every 100 females age 18 and over, there were 126.1 males.

The median income for a household in the township was $45,359, and the median income for a family was $59,259. Males had a median income of $37,500 versus $22,143 for females. The per capita income for the township was $25,208. About 10.9% of families and 9.9% of the population were below the poverty line, including 12.5% of those under age 18 and 10.1% of those age 65 or over.

School districts
 Central A & M Community Unit School District 21
 Pana Community Unit School District 8

Political districts
 State House District 98
 State Senate District 49

References
 
 United States Census Bureau 2009 TIGER/Line Shapefiles
 United States National Atlas

External links
 City-Data.com
 Illinois State Archives
 Township Officials of Illinois

Adjacent townships

Townships in Christian County, Illinois
Populated places established in 1865
Townships in Illinois